The 1987 Chinese Jia-A League was the first edition of top-flight football in China under the auspices of the Chinese Football Association. It featured 8 teams and was sponsored by Hong Kong company Goldlion.

Overview

Eight sides would play on a home and away basis. The winners would be crowned the 1st Jia-A League champions and would qualify for the next edition of the Asian Club Championship.

No teams would be relegated.

Clubs

Clubs and locations

League standings

References
China - List of final tables (RSSSF)

Chinese Jia-A League seasons
1
China
Chin
1987 establishments in China